East Prospect is a borough in York County, Pennsylvania, United States. The population was 932 at the 2020 census.

Geography
East Prospect is located at  (39.971506, -76.520601) and is situated on the west bank of the Susquehanna River opposite Washington Boro. The head end of the Amerindian-named Conejohela Valley (extends to the Chesapeake) and commercially developed dam-created Lake Clarke region are centered mid-river between the towns, and on a line, more or less from the two county capitals, York and Lancaster, which are also about equidistant. The borough is surrounded by Lower Windsor Township and is just west of the Susquehanna River.

Demographics

As of the census of 2000, there were 678 people, 258 households, and 198 families residing in the borough. The population density was 1,918.4 people per square mile (747.9/km2). There were 272 housing units at an average density of 769.6 per square mile (300.1/km2). The racial makeup of the borough was 99.41% White, and 0.59% from two or more races. Hispanic or Latino of any race were 1.18% of the population.

There were 258 households, out of which 40.7% had children under the age of 18 living with them, 64.0% were married couples living together, 8.1% had a female householder with no husband present, and 22.9% were non-families. 18.2% of all households were made up of individuals, and 7.4% had someone living alone who was 65 years of age or older. The average household size was 2.63 and the average family size was 2.97.

In the borough the population was spread out, with 28.5% under the age of 18, 5.6% from 18 to 24, 35.4% from 25 to 44, 18.6% from 45 to 64, and 11.9% who were 65 years of age or older. The median age was 33 years. For every 100 females there were 103.6 males. For every 100 females age 18 and over, there were 100.4 males.

The median income for a household in the borough was $41,250, and the median income for a family was $48,051. Males had a median income of $32,734 versus $23,036 for females. The per capita income for the borough was $16,787. About 1.4% of families and 4.9% of the population were below the poverty line, including 2.6% of those under age 18 and 6.3% of those age 65 or over.

Education
East Prospect is served by the Eastern York School District. Canadochly Elementary School is located in the borough.

References

Populated places established in 1849
Boroughs in York County, Pennsylvania
1874 establishments in Pennsylvania